was a Japanese actor and voice actor from Tateyama, Chiba. He was a graduate of Waseda University.

Filmography

Film
Dai Ninjutsu Eiga: Watari (Nagato Fujibayashi)
Fūrinkazan (Nobutomo Akiyama)
Onmitsu Dōshin Ōedo Sōsamō (Jūzō Isaka)

Television drama
Haru no Sakamichi (xxxx) (Kiyomasa Katō)
Kashin (xxxx) (Shōichirō Shiraishi)
Kitaro ga Mita Gyokusai - Mizuki Shigeru no Senso (xxxx) (Brigadier)
Meiji no Gunzō: Umi ni Karin wo (xxxx) (Tarō Katsura)
Ryōran Genroku (xxxx) (Tadakiyo Sakai)
Sangokushi Jirochō (xxxx) (Taisei)
Sanshimai (xxxx) (Isami Kondō)
Ultraman Ace (1972–73) (Captain Goro Ryu)
Tokugawa Ieyasu (1983) (Toshiie Maeda)
Sanada Taiheiki (1985–86) (Tadayo Sakai)

Variety programs
Waratte Iitomo Telephone Shocking (March 6, 1986)

Television animation
Alexander Senki (Plato)
Sangokushi (Guan Yu)
Sangokushi II: Amakakeru Otokotachi (Guan Yu)

OVA
Legend of the Galactic Heroes: Rasen Meikyū (Alfred Rosas)
Shinkai Teigunkan (Shintetsu Hinata)

Theatrical animation
Golgo 13 (Duke Togo/Golgo 13)

Dubbing roles
Annie: A Royal Adventure! (Daddy Warbucks (George Hearn))
Blood Work (2007 TV Tokyo edition) (Terry McCaleb (Clint Eastwood))
A Bridge Too Far (1978 NTV edition) (Roy Urquhart (Sean Connery))
Chinatown (J.J. "Jake" Gittes (Jack Nicholson))
Django (1974 TBS edition) (Django (Franco Nero))
Entrapment (Robert "Mac" MacDougal (Sean Connery))
Escape to Victory (Captain John Colby (Michael Caine))
Gunfight at the O.K. Corral (1985 TV Asahi edition) (Wyatt Earp (Burt Lancaster))
Just Cause (Paul Armstrong (Sean Connery))
Lawrence of Arabia (General Allenby (Jack Hawkins))
Mars Attacks! (2000 TV Tokyo edition) (President James Dale, Art Land (Jack Nicholson))
Million Dollar Baby (2006 TV Tokyo edition) (Frankie Dunn (Clint Eastwood))
Mister Roberts (1974 TV Asahi edition) (Douglas A. 'Doug' Roberts (Henry Fonda))
Once Upon a Time in the West (Frank (Henry Fonda))
Rising Sun (Captain John Connor (Sean Connery))
Space: 1999 (Commander John Koenig (Martin Landau))
There Was a Crooked Man... (Woodward Lopeman (Henry Fonda))
Unforgiven (1996 TV Asahi edition) (William "Will" Munny (Clint Eastwood))

References

External links
 

1937 births
2021 deaths
Japanese male film actors
Japanese male musical theatre actors
Japanese male television actors
Japanese male voice actors
Male voice actors from Chiba Prefecture
People from Tateyama, Chiba
Waseda University alumni
20th-century Japanese male actors
21st-century Japanese male actors
Neurological disease deaths in Japan
Deaths from motor neuron disease